Commersonia densiflora is a species of flowering plant in the family Malvaceae and endemic to the south-west of Western Australia. It is a dense, low-growing shrub with pinnate, elliptic to narrowly oblong, prominently veined leaves, and white flowers in clusters of 100 or more.

Description
The edges of the leaves are rolled under and wavy with irregular teeth, the upper surface has prominent veins, and both surfaces are densely covered with white, star-shaped hairs. Flowering occurs from August to November and the fruit is a hairy capsule  in diameter.

Taxonomy
This species was first formally described in 1849 by Nikolai Turczaninow who gave it the name Achilleopsis densiflora in the Bulletin de la Société Impériale des Naturalistes de Moscou from specimens collected by James Drummond. In 1876, Ferdinand von Mueller transferred the species to Commersonia as C. densiflora in his Fragmenta Phytographiae Australiae.

The specific epithet (densiflora) means "crowded-flowered".

Distribution and habitat
Commersonia densiflora grows in shrubland and woodland between Mullewa, Kalbarri and Shark Bay in the drier parts of the Avon Wheatbelt, Geraldton Sandplains, Swan Coastal Plain and Yalgoo bioregions of south-western Western Australia.

References

densiflora
Flora of Western Australia
Plants described in 1849
Taxa named by Nikolai Turczaninow